|}

The Irish Daily Star Chase is a Grade 3 National Hunt steeplechase in Ireland which is open to horses aged five years or older. It is run at Punchestown over a distance of about 3 miles and 1 furlongs (5,029 metres), and it is scheduled to take place each year in October.

The race was first run in 2005 and was awarded Grade 3 status in 2007. Prior to 2016 it was run over 2 miles and 7 furlongs.

Records
Most successful horse (3 wins):
 War Of Attrition – 2005,2006,2008

Leading jockey  (4 wins):
 Davy Russell -  War Of Attrition (2008), Roi Du Mee (2011), Galvin (2021,2022) 

Leading trainer (8 wins):
 Gordon Elliott -  Roi Du Mee (2011,2012), Toner D'Oudairies (2013), Don Cossack (2014,2015), The Storyteller (2020), Galvin (2021,2022)

Winners

See also 
 Horse racing in Ireland
 List of Irish National Hunt races

References
Racing Post:

Punchestown Racecourse
National Hunt chases
National Hunt races in Ireland
Recurring sporting events established in 2005
2005 establishments in Ireland